National Paddy Day is an annual festival in Nepal which marks the beginning of the rice planting season. It is celebrated on the 15th of Ashadh (29 June) every year. The festival is also named Ropain Diwas, Dhan Diwas, and Ashadh Pandra.

The festival usually starts with people making a parade in their village before entering the rice fields. People wear Nepali traditional clothes. According to OnlineKhabar, "Particular responsibilities are shared among men and women. Men plough the field, arrange drain water, level the fields and make fine mud slurry for the plantation". The people splash each other and play in the mud, plant rice seedlings, eat the traditional dish of curd and beaten rice, and sing folk songs. Some communities schedule related cultural programs.

The festival is also popular among tourists who visit Nepal and hence this festival also forms a part of agrotourism.

History and significance
According to the cultural norm, 15 Ashadh is "considered as the auspicious day to start rice planting for the year". The date falls during the monsoon season, an optimal time for rice planting. On 14 December 2004, the Nepal Government officially declared Ashadh 15 as National Paddy Day. The celebration takes place under the theme of "Increase rice production for self-sufficiency and prosperity".

The Provincial Assembly of Karnali Province has declared Ashadh 15 to be a public holiday in Karnali Province except for the Jumla District; paddy planting starts on 25 March in Jumla.

Rice contributes to about 7 percent of Nepal's GDP. In 2018, it was estimated that Nepal imports about Rs 25 billion worth of rice.

Foods
Curd and beaten rice are traditionally consumed on National Paddy Day. Yoghurt is also served.

Major developments
A survey by The Himalayan Times in 2020 reported that in many remote areas of Nepal, children were not aware of the festival. In 2020, it was reported that the festival celebration was stale because of the fear of the COVID-19 pandemic and locust infestation.

See also

 Agriculture in Nepal
 List of festivals in Nepal

References

Festivals in Nepal
Agriculture in Nepal